Sampsa Timoska (born 12 February 1979) is a Finnish footballer who plays in defence. He currently plays for Ekenäs IF.

His professional career began in Finland in 1996 at Tampere. Timoska moved to MyPa in 1998 making over 150 appearances before playing for English side Queen's Park Rangers between January 2007 and February 2008 where, after 21 appearances, he was released from his contract by mutual consent.

References

External links

1979 births
Living people
People from Kokemäki
Finnish footballers
Finnish expatriate footballers
Finland international footballers
Association football defenders
Finnish expatriate sportspeople in England
Expatriate footballers in England
Queens Park Rangers F.C. players
Myllykosken Pallo −47 players
Veikkausliiga players
Ekenäs IF players
Sportspeople from Satakunta